This is a list of candidates for the 1856 New South Wales colonial election. The election was held from 11 March to 19 April 1856.

There was no recognisable party structure at this election. This was the first election after the introduction of self-government to the colony.

Legislative Assembly
Successful candidates are highlighted.

Electorates are arranged chronologically from the day the poll was held.

See also
 Members of the New South Wales Legislative Assembly, 1856–1858

References
 

1856